Slite Church is a church in Slite, on the island of Gotland in Sweden.

The church was designed by the Danish architect Holger Jensen and built 1959–1960. It is built using only local materials such a pine wood and limestone. The rood cross and the sculpture of Mary are made by a local artist, Bertil Nyström.

References

Churches in Gotland County
Churches in the Diocese of Visby